The Somogy County Council is the local legislative body of Somogy County in Southern Transdanubia in Hungary.

Composition

2019 
The Council elected at the 2019 local government elections, is made up of 15 counselors, with the following party composition:
|-
|colspan=8 align=center| 
|-
! colspan="2" | Party
! Votes
! %
! +/-
! Seats 
! +/-
! Seats %
|-
| bgcolor=| 
| align=left | Fidesz–KDNP
| align=right| 55,058
| align=right| 52.93
| align=right| 4.98
| align=right| 9
| align=right| 
| align=right| 60.00
|-
| bgcolor=#ffdead| 
| align=left | Association for Somogy (SE)
| align=right| 16,631
| align=right| 15.99
| align=right| 1.04
| align=right| 2
| align=right| 
| align=right| 13.33
|-
| bgcolor=| 
| align=left | Jobbik
| align=right| 12,214
| align=right| 11.74
| align=right| 7.60
| align=right| 2
| align=right| 1
| align=right| 13.33
|-
| bgcolor=| 
| align=left | Democratic Coalition (DK)
| align=right| 9,336
| align=right| 8.22
| align=right| 3.18
| align=right| 1
| align=right| 
| align=right| 6.67
|-
| bgcolor=| 
| align=left | Momentum Movement (Momentum)
| align=right| 6,827
| align=right| 8.07
| align=right| 
| align=right| 1
| align=right| 1
| align=right| 6.67
|-
! align=right colspan=2| Total
! align=right| 104,016
! align=right| 100.0
! align=right| 
! align=right| 15
! align=right| 1
! align=right| 
|-
! align=right colspan=2| Voter turnout
! align=right| 
! align=right| 52.03
! align=right| 
! align=right| 
! align=right| 
! align=right| 
|}
After the elections in 2019 the Assembly controlled by the Fidesz–KDNP party alliance which has 9 councillors, versus 2 Jobbik, 2 Association for Somogy, 1 Democratic Coalition (DK) and 1 Momentum Movement councillors.

References 

Local government in Hungary
Somogy County